Human rights in Kyrgyzstan improved after the ouster of President Askar Akayev in the 2005 Tulip Revolution and the installment of a more democratic government under Roza Otunbayeva. While the country is performing well compared to other states in Central Asia, many human rights violations still take place. While LGBT rights have been declining in recent years, freedom of press has been improving.

The democratic performance of the country has been declining since 2014. Corruption is still an issue in the country although it has been steadily declining since 2008.

Formerly a republic of the Soviet Union, Kyrgyzstan became independent in 1991. Remaining reasonably stable throughout most of the 1990s, the country's young democracy showed relative promise under the leadership of Akayev, but moved towards autocracy and authoritarianism by the early 2000s, achieving a 5.5 rating from Freedom House in 2000. In 2020 the country is considered "partly free" by Freedom House with a score of 39 out of 100.

In 2004, prior to the democratic revolution, Kyrgyzstan was rated by Freedom House as "Not Free," with a 6 in Political Rights and 5 in Civil Liberties (scale of 1-7; 1 is the highest). This indicated marked regression, from a 4.3 rating a decade earlier in 1994. Although the 1993 Constitution defines the Kyrgyz Republic as a democratic republic, President Askar Akayev continued to dominate the government. Serious irregularities reportedly marred 2003 a national constitutional referendum as well as presidential and parliamentary elections in 2000.

History 
On September 14, 2001 the Kyrgyz Ministry of Interior declared it had implemented "passport control regime" against "pro-Islamic" activists in the southern part of Kyrgyzstan. Following the reelection of President Askar Akayev in 2003, the government reportedly "intensified" harassment of political opposition members, independent news media groups, religious groups and ethnic minorities, according to Human Rights Watch. In advance of elections in February 2005, the Akayev government reportedly increased political restrictions on Kyrgyz citizens, in order, according to some outside observers, to prevent a "democratic revolution" like the recent one in Ukraine.  

Human rights under Akayev's regime in 2004 reportedly remained poor; although there were some improvements in several areas, problems remained. Citizens' right to change their government remained limited and democratic institutions remained fragile. Members of the security forces at times beat or otherwise mistreated persons, and prison conditions remained poor. Impunity remained a problem, although the Government took steps to address it during the year. There were cases of arbitrary arrest or detention. Executive branch domination of the judiciary as well as corruption limited citizens' right to due process.

In June 2005, Kyrgyz officials said that 29 Uzbek refugees who had fled to Kyrgyzstan in the wake of the Andijan massacre would be returned to Uzbekistan. The United Nations and human rights groups criticized this decision, stating the refugees faced possible torture or execution upon their return. However, on June 27, the 439 Uzbek refugees were airlifted to safety out of the country by the United Nations.

Current situation

Press freedom 
Press freedom in Kyrgyzstan has been increasing since the crackdown on the media that preceded the 2017 elections and the pluralism in the Kyrgyz media landscape is exceptionally high in the Central Asian region. While performing relatively well, issues remain for journalism in the country. Sensitive government information is often inaccessible, journalists risk sanctions for covering controversial topics (like corruption) and ineffective media policy and management weaken the role of journalism in the country. Critical journalism is present in the country, but many media outlets don't cover topics that are too politically sensitive. Journalism in Kyrgyzstan, especially when related to religious topics or inter-ethnic relations, often still lack neutrality in its coverage.

Women's rights 
The country  suffers from high and rising inequalities, women are largely excluded from decision-making. Violence against women is widespread and takes many forms, including domestic violence, bride kidnapping, trafficking, early marriages and physical abuse. The negative reinterpretation of some cultural and social practices increasingly restricts women’s rights to control their lives. Rural women and girls have restricted access to productive resources.

Kyrgyzstan strengthened the 2016 Family Violence Law a year later and criminalized domestic violence in January 2019. However, authorities are not consistently enforcing protective measures for women and girls, including both the Family Violence Law and a 2016 law to curb child and forced marriage. In cooperation with the United Nations Kyrgyzstan developed a policy plan to decrease gender inequality in 2013, but women still suffer from their subordinated position in society.

Bride kidnapping 
As a consequence of changes in gender ideologies in Kyrgyzstan, there has been a revival and legitimation of nonconsensual bride kidnapping as a national tradition.  In this practise the groom abducts a girl off the street with a group of friends and brings her to his parents. Traditionally the women of the family will try to convince the girl to marry the boy who abducted her. Often girls have little choice, because refusing to marry often leads to being outcast by their parents. Even though in Kyrgyz law the practice is considered illegal and a violation of human rights since 2013, up to 50% of ethnic Kyrgyz marriages are a result of kidnappings, both consensual and non-consensual. In April 2021, protests broke out in Bishkek after a woman was found dead following a bride kidnapping. The country's president Sadyr Japarov released a statement calling for the incident to be "the last bride kidnapping in history".

LGBT rights 
Both male and female same-sex sexual activity are legal in Kyrgyzstan, but same-sex marriage is not recognised and even explicitly banned in the constitution since 2016. Lesbian, gay, bisexual, and transgender (LGBT) people continue to face ill-treatment, extortion, and discrimination by state and non-state actors.

Domestic violence against LGBT minors is a major issue and victims have limited access to government support. LGBT people are often unable to seek protection because of violence and other abuses by law enforcement agencies. Ill-treatment against LGBT people by law enforcement authorities is a systemic phenomenon in Kyrgyzstan according to Kyrgyz Indigo, a local LGBT advocacy group.

Various nationalist groups threatened LGBT interest groups during demonstrations in 2019, several parliament members responded by expressing their aversion to same sex couples, where one member said LGBT people should be “not just cursed, but beaten.” 

Transgender people are allowed to change legal gender in Kyrgyzstan, but require undergoing sex reassignment surgery. The first such surgery was performed in Bishkek in January 2014.

Recent developments
In a move to restrict the freedom of assembly amendments were made to the Law on the Right of Citizens to Hold Peaceful Assemblies 2002 in 2008 by the government and enacted by the president in 2010. Human Rights Watch criticised the amendments, claiming that they are violating the Kyrgyz constitution and international law.

In a move that alarmed human rights groups, dozens of prominent Uzbek religious and community leaders were arrested by security forces following the 2010 South Kyrgyzstan riots, including journalist and human rights activist Azimzhan Askarov. Following a trial criticised by several international human rights organizations, Askarov was given a life sentence charges including creating mass disturbances, incitement of ethnic hatred, and complicity in murder. Various human rights organizations stated that they believe the charges against him and his co-defendants to be politically motivated. Amnesty International considers Askarov a prisoner of conscience and is currently campaigning for his immediate release and an investigation into his allegations of torture by law enforcement.

On May 18, 2011, the Kadamjay Regional Court sentenced two young men, Iskandar Kambarov (18 years old) and Jonibek Nosirov (22 years old) to seven years in prison on the charge of possessing two DVDs of an extremist Islamic organization. The two men are not Islamic, but Jehovah’s Witnesses. The Norwegian human rights organization Forum 18 claims that the DVDs were planted as false evidence during a police raid. Their sentenced got overturned but it is unclear how the court case has developed further.

A more recent development took place in December 2017 with a negotiation between the EU and Kyrgyzstan. The purpose of the negotiation was to increase cooperation and agree upon a mutual understanding of countering terrorism. The discussion was centred around the respect for human rights as the EU Parliament called for political activist Azimjon Askarov to be released from his imprisonment.

Recently in 2019, during Soronbai Jeenbekov's presidency still no agreement was made on media freedom in Kyrgyzstan. Azimjon Askarov, a human right activists, still remains in prison.

In late July, human rights defender Azimzhan Askarov died in prison in Kyrgyzstan. He was 69 years old and was serving life imprisonment. Kyrgyz authorities ignored the United Nations Human Rights Committee ruling to release Askarov, as he was arbitrarily detained, tortured, and denied a fair trial. In May 2020, he made a final appeal, and Kyrgyz Supreme Court sustained his sentence.

In 2021 the caretaker parliament passed legislation that would punish groups that cause "political enmity" a move that according to Human Rights Watch would undermine freedom of expression and association.

Historical situation
The following chart shows Kyrgyzstan’s ratings since 1991 in the Freedom in the World reports, published annually by Freedom House. A rating of 1 is "free"; 7, "not free".

See also 

 Human trafficking in Kyrgyzstan
 Internet censorship and surveillance in Kyrgyzstan
 LGBT rights in Kyrgyzstan
 Religion in Kyrgyzstan
 Agriculture in Kyrgyzstan

Notes
1.Note that the "Year" signifies the "Year covered". Therefore the information for the year marked 2008 is from the report published in 2009, and so on.
2.As of January 1.

References

External links 

 
 (Russian)Human rights in Kyrgyzstan  - Jan. 30, 2010 (Human Rights in Central Asia)
 Reports on Kyrgyzstan - U.S. State Department
 Censorship in Kyrgyzstan - IFEX
 IPHR. The website of International Partnership for Human Rights (IPHR) contains a number of publications on current human rights issues in Kyrgyzstan.
 Addressing Ethnic Tension in Kyrgyzstan: Hearing before the Commission on Security and Cooperation in Europe, One Hundred Twelfth Congress, First Session, June 22, 2011
 World Report 2019: Kyrgyzstan events of 2018, viewed 25 March 2020, 

 
Society of Kyrgyzstan
Government of Kyrgyzstan
Politics of Kyrgyzstan
Kyrgyzstan
Law of Kyrgyzstan